Taqiabad-e Kan Kot (also Romanized as Taqīābād-e Kan Kot) is a village in Itivand-e Shomali Rural District, Kakavand District, Delfan County, Lorestan Province, Iran. At the 2006 census, its population was 194, in 32 families.

References 

Towns and villages in Delfan County